Lake Ozeros is a lake located west of the Greek city of Agrinio. The lake has its own catchment area but is sometimes connected to the waters of the Acheloos river, flowing from the northwest, when the river overflows.  The lake has a surface of ca. 10 km2 and an average depth of 8–10 m, but this varies greatly with the season. The road GR-5/E55 (Antirrio - Agrinio - Ioannina) runs to the northeastern side.

Nearest places
Agios Konstantinos, southeast
Kalyvia, south
Bampini, west
Fyteies, northwest

Landforms of Aetolia-Acarnania
Lakes of Greece
Agrinio
Landforms of Western Greece